Oceanport is a borough in Monmouth County, in the U.S. state of New Jersey. As of the 2010 United States census, the borough's population was 5,832, reflecting an increase of 25 (+0.4%) from the 5,807 counted in the 2000 Census, which had in turn declined by 339 (−5.5%) from the 6,146 counted in the 1990 Census.

Oceanport was formed as a borough by an act of the New Jersey Legislature on April 6, 1920, from portions of Eatontown Township (now Eatontown), based on the results of a referendum held on May 11, 1920.

New Jersey Monthly magazine ranked Oceanport as its 4th best place to live in its 2008 rankings of the "Best Places To Live" in New Jersey.

Geography

According to the United States Census Bureau, borough had a total area of 3.80 square miles (9.83 km2), including 3.17 square miles (8.22 km2) of land and 0.62 square miles (1.61 km2) of water (16.39%).

The borough borders the Monmouth County municipalities of Little Silver and Shrewsbury to the northwest, Long Branch to the east, Eatontown to the southwest and West Long Branch to the southeast. It shares water borders to the northeast with Monmouth Beach and Rumson and forms a peninsula, jutting into the Shrewsbury River.

Unincorporated communities, localities and place names within the borough include Elkwood Park, Fort Monmouth, Gooseneck Point, Port-au-peck and Sands Point.

Demographics

Census 2010

The Census Bureau's 2006–2010 American Community Survey showed that (in 2010 inflation-adjusted dollars) median household income was $89,208 (with a margin of error of +/− $18,245) and the median family income was $108,958 (+/− $21,795). Males had a median income of $60,038 (+/− $12,383) versus $49,415 (+/− $5,095) for females. The per capita income for the borough was $52,252 (+/− $9,172). About 3.1% of families and 4.2% of the population were below the poverty line, including 10.2% of those under age 18 and 2.5% of those age 65 or over.

Census 2000

As of the 2000 United States Census there were 5,807 people, 2,043 households, and 1,554 families residing in the borough. The population density was 1,802.1 people per square mile (696.3/km2). There were 2,114 housing units at an average density of 656.0 per square mile (253.5/km2). The racial makeup of the borough was 95.71% White, 1.96% African American, 0.07% Native American, 0.79% Asian, 0.02% Pacific Islander, 0.55% from other races, and 0.90% from two or more races. Hispanic or Latino of any race were 2.07% of the population.

There were 2,043 households, out of which 35.2% had children under the age of 18 living with them, 66.0% were married couples living together, 8.4% had a female householder with no husband present, and 23.9% were non-families. 21.7% of all households were made up of individuals, and 10.7% had someone living alone who was 65 years of age or older. The average household size was 2.71 and the average family size was 3.18.

In the borough the population was spread out, with 24.5% under the age of 18, 8.4% from 18 to 24, 25.5% from 25 to 44, 27.4% from 45 to 64, and 14.2% who were 65 years of age or older. The median age was 40 years. For every 100 females, there were 98.1 males. For every 100 females age 18 and over, there were 96.0 males.

The median income for a household in the borough was $71,458, and the median income for a family was $85,038. Males had a median income of $57,955 versus $39,718 for females. The per capita income for the borough was $33,356. About 1.8% of families and 2.7% of the population were below the poverty line, including 2.1% of those under age 18 and 3.5% of those age 65 or over.

Sports
Monmouth Park, a thoroughbred horse race track, is home to the annual Haskell Invitational Handicap. The choice to put the track in this small community in 1946 was made because of its prime location at the shore and its accessibility for New Yorkers and North Jersey folk who make up the majority of the track crowd. The Haskell Invitational Stakes, which next to the Triple Crown is horse racing's biggest event, takes place each year in August. In October 2007, Oceanport's Monmouth Park hosted the Breeders' Cup, attracting nearly 70,000 fans over the two days of the event.

Telephone service
The community is served by area codes 732 and 848 for landlines, Oceanport is served by the 222, 389, 229, 544 and 542 exchanges in Area Code 732. Mobile service is through area codes 732/848 and area code 908.

Government

Local government

Oceanport is governed under the Borough form of New Jersey municipal government, which is used in 218 municipalities (of the 564) statewide, making it the most common form of government in New Jersey. The governing body is comprised of the Mayor and the Borough Council, with all positions elected at-large on a partisan basis as part of the November general election. A Mayor is elected directly by the voters to a four-year term of office. The Borough Council is comprised of six members elected to serve three-year terms on a staggered basis, with two seats coming up for election each year in a three-year cycle. The Borough form of government used by Oceanport is a "weak mayor / strong council" government in which council members act as the legislative body with the mayor presiding at meetings and voting only in the event of a tie. The mayor can veto ordinances subject to an override by a two-thirds majority vote of the council. The mayor makes committee and liaison assignments for council members, and most appointments are made by the mayor with the advice and consent of the council.

, the Mayor of Oceanport Borough is Independent John F. "Jay" Coffey, II, whose term of office ends December 31, 2023, having run in the 2015 election as a write-in candidate. Members of the Borough Council are Council President Meghan Walker (I, 2022), William Deerin (R, 2024), Richard A. Gallo Jr. (R, 2023), Bryan Keeshen (R, 2023), Michael O'Brien (R, 2024) and Thomas J. Tvrdik (I, 2022).

In January 2020, the Borough Council selected Bryan Keeshen from a list of three candidates nominated by the Republican municipal committee to fill the seat expiring in December 2020 that had been held by Robert F. Proto until he resigned after the November 2019 general election.

In a special meeting held in August 2015, the Borough Council selected Stuart Briskey from a list of three candidates nominated by the Republican municipal committee to fill the seat expiring in December 2016 that had been held by Council President Robert Lynch until his resignation from office the previous month. Briskey served on an interim basis until the November 2015 general election, when he was elected to serve the balance of the term of office.

In March 2015, councilmember Jerry Bertekap resigned from office, leaving a vacancy in the term expiring December 2015. The Borough Council selected John Patti the following month to fill Bertekap's vacant seat.

In November 2013, Christopher Paglia was selected by the borough council from among three candidates offered by the Republican committee and appointed to fill the vacant seat of William Johnson, who had resigned to take a position with Monmouth County.

Oceanport is a participating municipality in an initiative to study regionalization of their municipal police force with one or more municipalities.  The borough received a grant from the New Jersey Department of Community Affairs in the amount of $40,950 along with the Boroughs of Fair Haven, Little Silver, Shrewsbury and Rumson to hire professional consultants to conduct the study on their behalf.  A report delivered in July 2008 recommended that Fair Haven, Little Silver and Rumson should consider a network of shared police services, with consideration of inclusion of Oceanport and Shrewsbury deferred to a second phase.

Federal, state and county representation
Oceanport is located in the 6th Congressional District and is part of New Jersey's 13th state legislative district. Prior to the 2011 reapportionment following the 2010 Census, Oceanport had been in the 12th state legislative district.

 

Monmouth County is governed by a Board of County Commissioners comprised of five members who are elected at-large to serve three year terms of office on a staggered basis, with either one or two seats up for election each year as part of the November general election. At an annual reorganization meeting held in the beginning of January, the board selects one of its members to serve as director and another as deputy director. , Monmouth County's Commissioners are
Commissioner Director Thomas A. Arnone (R, Neptune City, term as commissioner and as director ends December 31, 2022), 
Commissioner Deputy Director Susan M. Kiley (R, Hazlet Township, term as commissioner ends December 31, 2024; term as deputy commissioner director ends 2022),
Lillian G. Burry (R, Colts Neck Township, 2023),
Nick DiRocco (R, Wall Township, 2022), and 
Ross F. Licitra (R, Marlboro Township, 2023). 
Constitutional officers elected on a countywide basis are
County clerk Christine Giordano Hanlon (R, 2025; Ocean Township), 
Sheriff Shaun Golden (R, 2022; Howell Township) and 
Surrogate Rosemarie D. Peters (R, 2026; Middletown Township).

Politics
As of March 23, 2011, there were a total of 4,331 registered voters in Oceanport, of which 990 (22.9%) were registered as Democrats, 1,219 (28.1%) were registered as Republicans and 2,122 (49.0%) were registered as Unaffiliated. There were no voters registered to other parties.

In the 2016 presidential election, Republican Donald Trump received 59.2% (1,997 votes) of the vote, ahead of Democrat Hillary Clinton with 37.0% (1249 votes) among the total 3,375 ballots cast. In the 2012 presidential election, Republican Mitt Romney received 59.8% of the vote (1,836 cast), ahead of Democrat Barack Obama with 39.1% (1,200 votes), and other candidates with 1.0% (32 votes), among the 3,087 ballots cast by the borough's 4,379 registered voters (19 ballots were spoiled), for a turnout of 70.5%. In the 2008 presidential election, Republican John McCain received 56.9% of the vote (1,982 cast), ahead of Democrat Barack Obama with 40.4% (1,408 votes) and other candidates with 1.1% (40 votes), among the 3,481 ballots cast by the borough's 4,475 registered voters, for a turnout of 77.8%. In the 2004 presidential election, Republican George W. Bush received 60.5% of the vote (2,078 ballots cast), outpolling Democrat John Kerry with 38.3% (1,316 votes) and other candidates with 0.6% (28 votes), among the 3,433 ballots cast by the borough's 4,317 registered voters, for a turnout percentage of 79.5.

In the 2013 gubernatorial election, Republican Chris Christie received 75.2% of the vote (1,455 cast), ahead of Democrat Barbara Buono with 23.3% (452 votes), and other candidates with 1.5% (29 votes), among the 1,966 ballots cast by the borough's 4,336 registered voters (30 ballots were spoiled), for a turnout of 45.3%. In the 2009 gubernatorial election, Republican Chris Christie received 65.9% of the vote (1,615 ballots cast), ahead of  Democrat Jon Corzine with 26.2% (641 votes), Independent Chris Daggett with 6.5% (159 votes) and other candidates with 0.7% (17 votes), among the 2,450 ballots cast by the borough's 4,401 registered voters, yielding a 55.7% turnout.

Education

Students in pre-kindergarten through eighth grade in public school are educated by the Oceanport School District The district also includes students from Sea Bright, who attend as part of a sending/receiving relationship. As of the 2018–2019 school year, the district, comprised of two schools, had an enrollment of 599 students and 61.0 classroom teachers (on an FTE basis), for a student–teacher ratio of 9.8:1. Schools in the district (with 2018–2019 enrollment data from the National Center for Education Statistics) are 
Wolf Hill Elementary School with 342 students in pre-Kindergarten through 4th grade and 
Maple Place Middle School with 253 students in grades 5–8.

For ninth through twelfth grades, public school students attend Shore Regional High School, a regional high school that also serves students from the constituent districts of Monmouth Beach, Sea Bright and West Long Branch. The high school is located in West Long Branch and is part of the Shore Regional High School District. As of the 2018–2019 school year, the high school had an enrollment of 649 students and 57.2 classroom teachers (on an FTE basis), for a student–teacher ratio of 11.3:1. Seats on the high school district's nine-member board of education are allocated based on the population of the constituent municipalities, with three seats assigned to Oceanport.

Transportation

Roads and highways

Route 71 brushes the edge of Oceanport, while County Route 537 passes directly through Oceanport.

Public transportation
NJ Transit has a nearby limited-service stop at the Monmouth Park station for Monmouth Park Racetrack, offering seasonal service from May through October on the North Jersey Coast Line. NJ Transit local bus service is provided on the 831 route.

Notable people

People who were born in, residents of, or otherwise closely associated with Oceanport include:
 Charles W. Billings (1866–1928), politician who served until his death as Oceanport's first mayor and competitive shooter who was a member of the 1912 Summer Olympics American trapshooting team that won the gold medal in team clay pigeons
 Phil Bredesen (born 1943), Governor of Tennessee
 George Conway (–1939), horse trainer who trained War Admiral, winner of the Triple Crown in 1937
 John D'Amico Jr. (born 1941), former Oceanport councilmember who served as a county freeholder and state senator
 Brad Faxon (born 1961), professional golfer
 Harry Flaherty (born 1989), professional football tight end who has played for the New Orleans Saints and Dallas Cowboys
 S. Thomas Gagliano (1931–2019), politician who served on the Oceanport borough council and in the New Jersey Senate from 1978 to 1989
 Lewis G. Hansen (1891–1965), member of the New Jersey General Assembly who was the Democratic nominee who lost the 1946 Gubernatorial election
 Charles J. O'Byrne (born 1959), top aide to former Governor of New York David Paterson
 Charles Rembar (1915–2000), lawyer best known for his First Amendment litigation
 Kevin Smith (born 1970), filmmaker, lived in Oceanport in the 1990s

References

External links

 
1920 establishments in New Jersey
Borough form of New Jersey government
Boroughs in Monmouth County, New Jersey
Populated places established in 1920